Solanus Casey, OFM Cap. (November 25, 1870 – July 31, 1957), born Bernard Francis Casey, was a priest of the Catholic Church in the United States and was a professed member of the Order of Friars Minor Capuchin. He was known during his lifetime as a healer for his great faith and his abilities as a spiritual counselor, but especially for his great attention to the sick, for whom he celebrated special Masses. The friar was much sought-after and revered, especially in Detroit, where he resided. He was also a noted lover of the violin, a trait he shared with his eponym, Saint Francis Solanus.

The cause for his sainthood, initiated by the laity who so loved him, commenced a few years after his death; he was officially recognized as servant of God in 1982, and he received the title of Venerable in 1995. After a miraculous healing attributed to him was approved by Pope Francis in 2017, he was beatified in Detroit at Ford Field on November 18, 2017.

Life

Childhood and studies
Bernard Francis Casey (nicknamed "Barney") was born on November 25, 1870, on a farm in the town of Oak Grove, Pierce County, Wisconsin, the sixth of sixteen children born to Irish immigrants Bernard James Casey and Ellen Elizabeth Murphy. He was baptized on December 18, 1870. 

He contracted diphtheria in 1878, permanently damaging his voice, leaving it wispy and slightly impaired; two of his siblings died from the disease that year. The family later moved to Hudson, Wisconsin. In 1878, he began school at Saint Mary's, but this was cut short in October 1882 when the family relocated again, to Burkhardt in Saint Croix County. In 1887, he left the farm for a series of jobs in his home state and nearby Minnesota, working as a lumberjack, a hospital orderly, a guard in the Minnesota state prison, and a street car operator in Superior. His time as a prison guard saw him befriend a couple of Jesse James' cohorts. At first, he desired married life, but the mother of a girl to whom he had proposed suddenly sent her off to a boarding school.

While working at his last job on the trolleys in Superior, Wisconsin, he witnessed a violent act that caused him to evaluate his life and future. Some reports say that he saw a drunken sailor standing over a bleeding woman with a knife in his hand. He then acted on a call to the priesthood. Due to his limited formal education, he enrolled at Saint Francis High School Seminary, the minor seminary of the Archdiocese of Milwaukee, in January 1891, hoping to become a diocesan priest. Classes there were taught in either German or Latin, neither of which he knew. In due course, he was advised that he should consider joining a religious order if he wanted to become a priest due to his academic limitations. He returned home before deciding to make his application.

While reflecting before a statue of the Blessed Virgin Mary, he heard her spiritual voice telling him to "go to Detroit". He then applied to the Order of Friars Minor Capuchin in that city. He was received into it on January 14, 1897. He was given the religious name of "Solanus" after Saint Francis Solanus; both men shared a love of the violin. He made his vows on July 21, 1898. He struggled through his studies but received ordination to the priesthood on July 24, 1904, from Archbishop Sebastian Messmer at Saint Francis of Assisi Church in Milwaukee. Because he had not performed well enough in his studies, he was ordained as a "simplex" priest. He celebrated his first Mass on July 31, 1904, in Appleton, with his family present.

Ministry
He served for two decades in a succession of friaries in New York. His first assignment was at Sacred Heart Friary in Yonkers. He was later transferred to New York City, where he first served at Saint John's Church next to Penn Station and later at Our Lady Queen of Angels in Harlem.

He was recognized as a healer and gifted spiritual counselor. In August 1924, he was transferred to the Saint Bonaventure convent in Detroit, where he worked until 1945. During this time, he mostly served as the simple porter (or receptionist and doorkeeper). Each Wednesday afternoon, he conducted well-attended services for the sick, and through these services, he became known for his great compassion and simple holiness. People considered him instrumental in cures and other blessings. He loved to kneel before the Eucharist in the quiet of the night.

During his time at St. Bonaventure's, Casey was involved in the formation of the Capuchin Soup Kitchen. The soup kitchen was founded in 1929 to provide food for Detroit's poor during the Great Depression. Casey is considered one of the founders of the soup kitchen, which is still in operation today.

As a violinist, he loved playing Irish songs for his fellow friars during recreation time but was not a gifted instrumentalist. He had a poor singing voice, attributed to having suffered from diphtheria as a child. This disease took the lives of two of his sisters. Often Solanus could be found playing his violin in the chapel for the tabernacle. He ate little. Until his late seventies, he joined the younger religious in games of tennis and volleyball.

Declining health and death

In 1946, in failing health and suffering from eczema over his entire body, he was transferred to the Capuchin novitiate of Saint Felix in Huntington, Indiana, where he lived until a 1956 hospitalization in Detroit. In 1957, he was rushed to the hospital for food poisoning; upon his release, friars noted that he was walking much more slowly and scratching his legs; it turned out that his skin was raw and infected, prompting a return to the hospital. The doctors diagnosed him with erysipelas or possibly psoriasis, which was beyond treatment, and they considered limb amputation, but the ulcers began to heal.

On July 2, 1957, he was readmitted to the hospital for the final time due to skin deterioration. He was given oxygen therapy. Casey's sister, Martha, came to visit him after being notified of the seriousness of his condition; the two prayed the rosary together.

He died from erysipelas at 11:00 am on July 31, 1957, at Saint John Hospital in Detroit, with only his nurse at his side. A commemorative plaque was placed outside the door of the room. His last words were reportedly: "I give my soul to Jesus Christ." An estimated 20,000 people filed past his coffin before his funeral and burial in the cemetery of his Detroit monastery. On July 8, 1987, his remains were exhumed and reinterred inside the chapel at Saint Bonaventure Monastery, which eventually became part of the Solanus Casey Center; his remains showed no signs of the skin disease that afflicted him at the end of his life. His remains were clothed in a new habit before reinternment in a steel casket at the north transept. A range of miraculous cures has been attributed to his intercession during his earthly life and death. although Rome has officially recognized only one.

Exhumation
His remains were exhumed to collect first- and second-class relics on August 1, 2017. They were then placed in a new black casket and reinterred with a plexiglass dome to make the new casket visible.

Beatification
His beatification cause commenced in Detroit in 1976 with an investigation involving witness interrogatories and documentation compiling. The Congregation for the Causes of Saints validated this phase on November 7, 1986; around 1995, it received the Positio dossier from postulation officials. The theological advisors approved the dossier on April 7, 1995; the cardinal and bishop members of the congregation did so on June 20, 1995. On July 11, 1995, Pope John Paul II, in a private audience with congregation prefect Alberto Bovone, confirmed that Casey had lived a life of heroic virtue and titled him Venerable.

For a person to be beatified - unless they are a martyr - ordinarily, a miracle (normally, healing) must be approved following confirmation that science could not explain it. Numerous cases were investigated, including one considered by the congregation on April 3, 1998, which was later dismissed. The Archdiocese of Detroit investigated another purported miracle; its favorable report was completed and forwarded to Rome in 2015. This received congregation validation on October 12, 2015; approval by a panel of medical experts on September 22, 2016; and theological consulters' approval on January 19, 2017. The congregation approved the miracle on May 2, 2017, and Pope Francis did so two days later, meaning that the late friar would be beatified. On November 18, 2017, the beatification occurred at Ford Field in Detroit in front of an estimated crowd of 70,000. The Mass and beatification rite was led by Cardinal Angelo Amato, the prefect for the congregation. Casey now has the title "Blessed" and is one step closer to sainthood.

Casey's confirmed miracle involved curing Paula Medina Zarate's ichthyosis, a genetic skin condition. The miracle occurred at St. Bonaventure Monastery in Detroit in 2012.

The postulator for Casey's cause was his fellow Capuchin friar Carlo Calloni. The current vice-postulator is Edward Foley.

Quotations

 The only science that gives purpose to every other science is the science of religion—the science of our happy relationship with and providential dependence on God and our neighbor.
 We are continually immersed in God's merciful grace like the air that permeates us.
 Gratitude is the first sign of a thinking, rational creature.
 Thank you, God, in all your designs.
 Confidence is the very soul of prayer.
 Do not pray for easy lives; pray to be stronger people. Do not pray for tasks equal to your powers; pray for powers equal to your tasks.
 Like the Holy Trinity, Faith, Hope, and Charity are one. Theoretically, Faith, like the Eternal Father, comes first, but in both cases, they are essentially one.
 God condescends to use our powers if we don't spoil His plans by ours.
 We must be faithful to the present moment or we will frustrate the plan of God for our lives.
 Many are the rainbows, the sunbursts, the gentle breezes—and the hailstorms—we are liable to meet before, by the grace of God, we shall be able to tumble into our graves with the confidence of tired children into their places of peaceful slumber.
 "I had been in agony for at least 40 hours, though no one else seemed to know it, and while I tried to thank God for it all, my principal prayer—at least 1,000 times repeated—was 'God help us.'"
 "I'm offering my sufferings that all might be one. If only I could see the conversion of the whole world."
 "Thank God ahead of time."

See also

 Franciscan
 Franciscan orders
 Gifts of healing
 Studies on intercessory prayer
 Conrad of Parzham

References

Further reading
Casey, Solanus; Casey, Bernadine (ed.). Letters from Solanus Casey OFM. Cap.: God Bless You and Yours. Detroit: Father Solanus Guild, 2000.
 Derum, James Patrick. The Porter of Saint Bonaventure's: The Life of Father Solanus Casey, Capuchin. Detroit: Fidelity Press, 1968.
 Odell, Catherine. Father Solanus: The Story of Father Solanus. Huntington, Ind.: Our Sunday Visitor Press, 1988.
 Della Balda, Gabriele. Una carezza di Dio. Vita del beato Solanus Casey, cappuccino statunitense. Roma, Istituto Storico dei Cappuccini 2019 (ITALIAN)

External links
 Solanus Casey Center
 Hagiography Circle
 Father Solanus Guild
 Find-a-Grave

 Film: The Healing Prophet: Solanus Casey
 Newspaper article

1870 births
1957 deaths
19th-century venerated Christians
20th-century venerated Christians
20th-century American Roman Catholic priests
American Roman Catholic clergy of Irish descent
Beatifications by Pope Francis
Burials in Michigan
Capuchins
Clergy from Detroit
People from Pierce County, Wisconsin
People of the Roman Catholic Archdiocese of New York
Religious leaders from Michigan
Religious leaders from Wisconsin
Venerated Catholics by Pope John Paul II
Catholics from Wisconsin
American beatified people